W. Alan J. Watson (1933 – 7 November 2018) was a Scottish legal historian, regarded as one of the world's foremost authorities on Roman law, comparative law, legal history, and law and religion. He is credited for coining the term "legal transplants".

Watson was educated at St John's Grammar school and at the Hamilton Academy, subsequently attending the Glasgow University, graduating in Arts in 1954 and in Law in 1957. He began his professional academic career at Oxford University, before taking the Douglas Chair in Civil Law at the School of Law of his alma mater, the University of Glasgow. He later served as Distinguished Research Professor and held the Ernest P. Rogers Chair at the University of Georgia School of Law. He was also Visiting Professor at the Edinburgh University School of Law, where he held the Chair in Civil Law from 1968 until 1981.

Watson regularly served as a distinguished lecturer at leading universities in the United States and such countries as Italy, Holland, Germany, France, Poland, South Africa, Israel and Serbia. He attended several sessions regarding the development of a common law for the EU, including one in Maastricht in 2000, and, at the request of the U.S. Agency for International Development (USAID), served as a member of the two-person U.S. team helping to revise the draft civil code for Armenia.

He was an honorary member of the Speculative Society and served as North American secretary of the Stair Society. He was an editorial board member of a number of learned journals.

In 2005, the University of Belgrade's Law School established the Alan Watson Foundation in honour of his worldwide scholarship.

Watson was honoured by his international colleagues in 2000–01 when two collections of essays were presented in his honour: an American volume, Lex et Romanitas: Essays for Alan Watson, and the European volume, Critical Studies in Ancient Law, Comparative Law and Legal History.

Legal scholarship
Watson authored nearly 150 books and articles, many of which have been translated from English into other languages. Selected scholarship includes the important books Legal Transplants: An Approach to Comparative Law (1974) and Society and Legal Change (1977) as well as The Evolution of Western Private Law (2000), Jesus and the Jews: The Pharisaic Tradition in John (1995), Ancient Law and Modern Understanding: At the Edges (1998), Sources of Law, Legal Change, and Ambiguity (2d ed., 1998), Legal History and a Common Law for Europe (2001), Authority of Law; and Law (2003), and The Shame of American Legal Education (2005). His articles include "Law Out of Context" in The Edinburgh Law Review (2000) and "Fox Hunting, Pheasant Shooting and Comparative Law" in the American Journal of Comparative Law (2000).

References
 Glasgow Herald 19 February 1965, page 10. Article on appointment to the Douglas Chair of Civil Law, University of Glasgow
 Alan Watson Foundation
 Biography at Edinburgh Law School website
 Profile at UGA Law School site
 UGA News: Professor Alan Watson receives sixth honorary degree
 Remembering Professor Alan Watson (1933 - 2018)
 Gabor Hamza: Watson, A.: Legal Transplants. An Approach to Comparative Law. Scottish Academic Press, Edinburgh, 1974. XIV+106 p. Állam- és Jogtudomány 20 (1977) 642-644.p. and Acta Juridica Academiae Scientiarum Hungaricae 20 (1978) 240-242.p.
 Gabor Hamza: Watson, A.: Rome of the XII Tables. Persons and Property. Princeton University Press, Princeton, 1975. 195 p. Állam- és Jogtudomány 19 (1976) 491-493.p.
 Gabor Hamza: Watson, A.: Legal Transplants. An Approach to Comparative Law. (Second revised ed.) London, 1993. Jogtudományi Közlöny 49 (1994) 265-266. p. 
 Gabor Hamza: Watson, A.: The State, Law, and Religion: Pagan Rome. Athens. Jogtudományi Közlöny 50 (1995) 99-100. p.
 Gabor Hamza: Watson, A.: International Law in Archaic Rome: War and Religion. Jogtudományi Közlöny 50 (1995) 359-361. p.

1933 births
2018 deaths
Academics from Edinburgh
People educated at Hamilton Academy
Alumni of the University of Glasgow
Legal scholars of the University of Oxford
Academics of the University of Glasgow
University of Georgia faculty
Academics of the University of Edinburgh
Scottish emigrants to the United States
American legal scholars
Scottish legal scholars
Scottish lawyers
20th-century Scottish historians
Legal historians